The Association of Engineers, Architects and Graduates in Technological Sciences in Israel (AEAI) is the professional representative body of these sectors in the country. The association aims to be a national center, which cultivates and promotes the engineering, architecture and technology economy, as well as works to promote the professional status of the engineers and architects in Israel.

History	
The Association of Engineers, Architects and Graduates in Technological Sciences in Israel was established in 1922, for the engineers and architects communities and built in Tel-Aviv in 1936 the "Engineer and Architect House" for its activities. Over the course of the years, the AEAI established professional public institutions such as the Standards Institution of Israel, Israel Institute of Productivity and The Israeli Building Center. In 1985 the AEAI expended, adding up graduates in the technological sciences.

The association led to the legislation of the Engineers and Architects Law in the Knesset in 1958. The law regulates the professions of engineering and architecture, and ensures that the public receives professional services (planning, counseling, supervision and performance) only from those authorized for that purpose. This law has been modified, the last of which was in 1992.

Legal status
The association is acknowledged in the Engineers and Architects law, in the Planning and Building law, in the Standards law and in the Free Production Zone law. The association is also acknowledged by the Ministry of Industry (responsible by the government for the Engineers and Architects law), as the representative organization for engineering and architecture professions in Israel.
The association is recognized by the chief justice and the courts administration as the professional and public organization, responsible for appointing experts and arbitrators as a service to the Israeli courthouse. The association also appoints the public's professional representatives in the local building and planning committees, the regional ones, the national council etc.

Institutes
There is a National Congress in the AEAI, chosen by all its members in a proportional representation election. The senior positions, such as the president, the chairman, the professional societies chairmen etc., are voluntary. 
The AEAI current president is Eng. Yitzhak Raz. The association chairman is Eng. Ehud Noff, who also serves as chairman of the Federation of Engineers (the labor union).
Within the Association of Engineers there are professional societies in various technological fields:Civil Engineering,  Mechanical Engineering, Chemical Engineering and Chemistry, Electrical and Electronics Engineering, Industrial and Management Engineering, Safety Engineering, Computer Science and Software, Construction and Infrastructure Engineering, Architecture and City planning and Municipal Engineering. The branches within the professional societies operate on specific or multi-disciplinary issues.
- There are four regional centers: Tel Aviv and the Center, Haifa and the North, Beer Sheva and the south and Jerusalem. Recently the AEAI had also activated branches in workplaces employing a large number of engineers, such as: Israel Aircraft Industries, the Military Industry, Bezeq and the IDF Employees.

Activities within the association
- Professional updates via courses, national and international conferences, seminars, professional tours, professional lectures, etc., in order to regularly expose the engineers to innovations in their fields, and thus improve and promote their professional level. Members enjoy significant discounts in these activities.
- Initiating and changing legislation in the fields of engineering and technology, in order to make sure that the general public will receive services only from those authorized for that purpose.
- Representation of the engineering professions in public and statutory institutions: the Association of Engineers has nine representatives in the Engineering and Architecture Council. The association has also representatives in other important institutions, such as: the Israeli Standards Institution, the Higher Education Institution, Knesset committees, regional and local construction committees etc., allowing a direct influence on the economy.
- Appointing arbitrators and experts as a service to the Israeli courthouse and the general public.
- Relationships with parallel organizations in Israel and abroad.
- Relationships with academic institutions, in which the engineering, architecture, science and technology subjects are studied, as well as establishing and maintaining connections with the  industry.
- Integration of engineering students and young graduates in the associations' professional activities, in order to nurture the next generation.
- Publications of relevant information via the Association Website and newsletters.

Former key figures

External links
 Association of Engineers website

Engineering organizations